The Fatherland Defense Order is an award conferred by the Government of Vietnam. It is awarded to individuals and organizations for achievements in training and building forces and in strengthening national defense and security.

Individual awards
It is conferred or posthumously conferred on individuals who satisfy one of the following criteria:

 Having inventions, scientific works or outstanding works of the State level;
 Having recorded unexpected exceptionally outstanding achievements or consistent devotion in the armed forces.

Collective awards
It is conferred on collectives which satisfy one of the following criteria:

 Having been conferred the second-class Fatherland Defense Order, the Excellent Labor Collective or Determined-To-Win Unit title for the subsequent five consecutive years, and the Emulation Flag of the ministerial-, branch-. provincial- or central mass organization-level for three times or the Government's Emulation Flag twice;
 Having recorded unexpected exceptionally outstanding achievements.

See also 
 Vietnam awards and decorations

References

Orders, decorations, and medals of Vietnam
Military awards and decorations of Vietnam
Awards established in 2003
2003 establishments in Vietnam